A Fleet Commander may refer to:

 Fleet Commander, a rank in the Royal Navy
 Fleet commander (Kriegsmarine), a rank in the German Kriegsmarine
 A fleet commander of a numbered fleet

See also
Fleet Command, 1999 computer game
Fleet Command (SA Navy), South African Navy command